Dean Charles Blais (born January 18, 1951) is an American ice hockey coach. He was the head coach of the Omaha Mavericks, the men's team of the University of Nebraska Omaha, and also head coach of the United States men's national junior ice hockey team. He led Team USA to a gold medal in the IIHF 2010 World Junior Ice Hockey Championships in Saskatoon, Canada, held in late December 2009 through early January 2010.

He is the former associate coach of the NHL's Columbus Blue Jackets. He led the University of North Dakota Fighting Sioux (now Fighting Hawks) men's hockey team to NCAA Division I championships in 1997 and 2000. Blais also has two other appearances in the Frozen Four, the semifinal round of the NCAA tournament—with North Dakota in 2001 (losing in the championship game) and Omaha in 2015 (losing in the semifinals). Blais also led the 1990 Roseau Rams to a Minnesota State High School Hockey Championship.

Playing career
A native of International Falls, Minnesota, Blais played college hockey at the University of Minnesota from 1970 to 1973. He was selected by the Chicago Blackhawks in the 5th round (68th overall) of the 1971 NHL Amateur Draft, and played three seasons of pro hockey with the Chicago Blackhawks’ development team in Dallas. He also played for the United States national team at the 1973 ice hockey world championship pool B tournament.

In popular culture
On March 10, 2009 and May 14, 2010, a photograph of Blais was shown on the Late Show with David Letterman for a segment called, "Guys who look like Dave."

Career
1976–1977 – University of Minnesota – Assistant Coach
1977–1980 – Minot High School (Minot, North Dakota) – Head Coach
1980–1989 – University of North Dakota – Assistant Coach
1990–1991 – Roseau High School (Roseau, Minnesota) – Head Coach
1991–1994 – International Falls High School (International Falls, Minnesota) – Head Coach
1994–2004 – University of North Dakota – Head Coach
2004–2006 – Columbus Blue Jackets (NHL) – Associate Coach
2006–2007 – Columbus Blue Jackets (NHL) – Player Development
2007–2009 – Fargo Force (USHL) – General Manager/Head Coach
2009–2010 – Team USA U20 – Head Coach
2009–2017 – University of Nebraska Omaha – Head Coach
2012–present – Team USA U20 – Head Coach
1991-1992 - Assistant coach Olympic men’s ice hockey team

Head coaching record

Awards and honors

See also
List of college men's ice hockey coaches with 400 wins

References

External links

1951 births
Living people
American ice hockey coaches
Chicago Blackhawks draft picks
Columbus Blue Jackets coaches
Dallas Black Hawks players
High school ice hockey coaches in the United States
Minnesota Golden Gophers men's ice hockey players
North Dakota Fighting Hawks men's ice hockey coaches
Omaha Mavericks men's ice hockey coaches
People from International Falls, Minnesota
American men's ice hockey forwards
Ice hockey coaches from Minnesota
Ice hockey players from Minnesota